Lopilato is a surname. Notable people with the surname include:

 Darío Lopilato (born 1981), Argentinian actor
 Luisana Lopilato (born 1987), Argentinian actress and model